Helis Nunatak (Nunatak Helis \'nu-na-tak 'he-lis\) is a crown-shaped rocky peak of elevation 340 m in Vidin Heights on Varna Peninsula, Livingston Island in the South Shetland Islands, Western Antarctica.  The peak is named after the ancient Thracian capital town of Helis whose remains are located at Sveshtari, northeastern Bulgaria.

Location

Maps
 L.L. Ivanov et al. Antarctica: Livingston Island and Greenwich Island, South Shetland Islands. Scale 1:100000 topographic map. Sofia: Antarctic Place-names Commission of Bulgaria, 2005.
 L.L. Ivanov. Antarctica: Livingston Island and Greenwich, Robert, Snow and Smith Islands. Scale 1:120000 topographic map.  Troyan: Manfred Wörner Foundation, 2009.

References
 Helis Nunatak. SCAR Composite Antarctic Gazetteer
 Bulgarian Antarctic Gazetteer. Antarctic Place-names Commission. (details in Bulgarian, basic data in English)

External links
 Helis Nunatak. Copernix satellite image

Nunataks of Livingston Island